Scotts is an unincorporated community in Iredell County, North Carolina, United States. Scotts has a post office with ZIP code 28699.

References

Unincorporated communities in Iredell County, North Carolina
Unincorporated communities in North Carolina